María Nsué Angüe (1945 – 18 January 2017) was a noted Equatoguinean writer and Minister of Education and Culture.

Background and early life
María was born in Ebebeyín, Río Muni. Her family immigrated to Spain when she was a child where she studied literature. Born to ethnic Fang parents, she emigrated with her family to Spain when she was only eight years old. In narrating her own life, Maria Nsue often underscores the primal and formative impact of colonial interventions. She claims to have been born in jail, in 1948, in the city of Bata, where her parents had been confined for resisting the authority of the colonial regime. She belongs to the Fang ethnic group. She is the only child of José Nsue Angue Osá—an anticolonial and proindependence leader. She spent her early childhood in Bidjabidján as a result of the arbitrary delineations of European colonial cartographers and policy makers. At the age of eight, Maria Nsue was entrusted to a Protestant missionary family temporarily assigned to the local mission. This is the family that later took her to Madrid. She spent her youth under the Francoist regime. She would eventually return to Equatorial Guinea in her twenties after the country's independence.

Education 
Angüe studied literature, music and journalism in Madrid.

Writings
Her 1985 novel, and most acclaimed work, Ekomo was the first novel written by an Equatoguinean woman to be published. It tells the story of a Fang woman and her husband. Ekomo is considered a work that changes the way one views the world. Equatorial Guinea which once belonged to Spain gained its independence in 1968 and then fell under a military dictatorship. La Guinea Española is the beginning of Guinean literature where many works were published reflecting on the connections and the clash between Guinean, Spanish, and Latin American cultures. Ekomo is considered Hispano-African Literature which differs from Afro-Hispanic literature. Nnange is the main character of the novel writing after the death of her husband Ekomo. She tells of the struggles of attempting to find a cure for her husband's illness. She then begins reflecting on a woman's place in society and her current position as an outcast without a husband or children. Ekomo is the first novel written by a woman in Equatorial Guinea.

Constant themes in her writing are the oppression of women and the consequences of colonization.

Works

Poetry, articles and poems

Nsué Angüe also wrote several short stories, articles and poems. Frequent topics addressed in her work involve women's rights and post-colonial African society. Much of her work is inspired by popular Fang literature. In addition to Ekomo, she is the author of a volume of short stories entitled Relatos (1999), largely based on traditional Fang stories of rural life, told as if from the perspective of a grandmother, but intertwined with an unrelenting criticism of the politico-economic situation in her country. Similarly rooted in tradition, but integrating percussion and live performance through the application of modern technologies, is the CD-ROM project  Mbayah, o la leyenda del sauce llorón (Mbayah, or the Legend of the Weeping Willow), released in 1997, for which she composed the narrative and music.

 Ngouaba Nya, Jean Paul. Sobre los llamados "adjetivos relacionales" en el español de Guinea Ecuatorial : caso de "Ekomo" de María Nsué Angüe / Jean Paul Ngouaba Nya. Madrid, España: ACCI, Asociación Cultural y Científica Iberoamericana, 2017.
Nsué Angüe, María, 1948- author. Short stories. SelectionsCuentos y relatos / María Nsué ; prólogo de Gloria Nistal.Primera edición. Madrid (España): Sial Ediciones, 2016.
La recuperación de la memoria: creación cultural e identidad nacional en la literatura hispano-negroafricana, M'bare N'gom (compilador)]. [Alcalá de Henares, Spain]: Universidad de Alcalá, Servicio de Publicaciones, [2004?]
 Miriam DeCosta-Willis (ed.), Daughters of the diaspora: Afra-Hispanic writers , Kingston; Miami: I. Randle, 2003.

References

 Angüe, María Nsué. (1985) Ekomo. Madrid: UNED (Universidad Nacional de Educación a Distancia). 

1945 births
2017 deaths
Culture ministers of Equatorial Guinea
Education ministers of Equatorial Guinea
Equatoguinean novelists
Equatoguinean short story writers
Equatoguinean poets
Equatoguinean emigrants to Spain
Equatoguinean women writers
Equatoguinean women poets
20th-century novelists
20th-century poets
20th-century women writers
People from Ebibeyin
20th-century short story writers
20th-century women politicians
Women government ministers of Equatorial Guinea